David Brunclík (born 17 April 1985) is a Czech professional footballer who currently plays for FK Kratonohy. Brunclík has played international football at under-21 level for Czech Republic U21.

References

External links 
 
 Guardian Football
 

Czech footballers
Czech Republic youth international footballers
Czech Republic under-21 international footballers
Czech First League players
FK Mladá Boleslav players
FK Chmel Blšany players
SK Kladno players
FK Ústí nad Labem players
SK Dynamo České Budějovice players
Czech National Football League players
1985 births
Living people
Association football midfielders